Karyochori (Greek: Καρυοχώρι meaning walnut village, before 1927: Κοζλούκιοϊ - Kozloukioi) is a village in the municipal unit of Agia Paraskevi in the Kozani regional unit, northern Greece. Karyochori is built in a valley at the elevation of 710 m above sea level. It is located 2 km southeast of Agios Christoforos, 8 km east of Ptolemaida and 22 km north of Kozani. There are large open-pit lignite mines to the south and west of Karyochori, and farmlands to the north.

Historical population

See also
List of settlements in the Kozani regional unit

References

External links
GTP - Karyochori
https://web.archive.org/web/20050420064157/http://www.kozani.gr/Nomos/DHMOI/s_AgParaskevis.html
https://web.archive.org/web/20070928074454/http://www.kozani.net/a/dimoi/agiaparaskevi/

Populated places in Kozani (regional unit)